The discography of Shawty Lo, an American hip hop recording artist from Atlanta, Georgia. Shawty Lo embarked on his career with the Southern hip hop group D4L. The discography consists of one studio album, one posthumous album, 15 mixtapes and 20 singles (including 12 as a featured artist).

Albums

Studio albums

Mixtapes

Singles

As lead artist

As featured artist

Other charted songs

Guest appearances

2008
 "WOW (Remix)" (Kia Shine featuring Shawty Lo & Streetknok) 
 "This Is The Life (Remix)" (Rick Ross featuring Shawty Lo, Triple C's, Flo Rida, Brisco & Baby) 
 "My Bumper (Remix)" (Cene featuring Shawty Lo) 
 "Born & Raised" (GhostWridah featuring Shawty Lo) 
 "Money" (Capone-n-Noreaga featuring Shawty Lo) 
 "My Way" (Kieran featuring Shawty Lo & Yung Joc)
 "So Fly (Remix)" (Slim featuring Shawty Lo & Yung Joc)
 "Gucci Bandanna" (Soulja Boy Tell 'Em featuring Gucci Mane & Shawty Lo) iSouljaBoyTellEm
 "Break Ya Ankles" (E-40 featuring Shawty Lo) The Ball Street Journal
 "Final Warning" (DJ Khaled featuring Bun B, Bloodraw, Ace Hood, Brisco, Lil' Scrappy, Bali, Rock City, & Shawty Lo) We Global
 "2 Sides" (Killer Mike featuring Shawty Lo) I Pledge Allegiance to the Grind II
 "Icey" (Baby D featuring Gucci Mane & Shawty Lo) A-Town Secret Weapon
2009 
 "Perfect Woman" (Masspike Miles featuring Shawty Lo)
 "Let Me Do My Thang" (Mims featuring Shawty Lo)
 "17.5 (Remix)" (Block Life featuring E-40 & Shawty Lo)
 "20 Dollars (Remix)" (Ron Browz featuring Mase, OJ da Juiceman, Jim Jones, & Shawty Lo)
 "We Be Gettin' Money" (Juvenile featuring Dorrough & Shawty Lo) Cocky & Confient
 "About My B.I." (Mýa with Shawty Lo) Beauty & the Streets Vol. 1
2010
 "That's The Way The Game Goes" (Game featuring Shawty Lo)
 "Coca Coca" (Gucci Mane featuring Rocko, OJ da Juiceman, Waka Flocka Flame, Shawty Lo, Yo Gotti & Nicki Minaj) Burrrprint (2) HD 
 "Get Big (Remix)" (Dorrough, featuring DJ Drama, Diddy, Yo Gotti, Bun B, Diamond, Shawty Lo, Wiz Khalifa & Maino)
2011
 "Haters" (Tony Yayo, featuring 50 Cent, Shawty Lo, Roscoe Dash)
 "Wet" (Remix) (Snoop Dogg featuring Jim Jones & Shawty Lo)
 "Hood Shit" Trae tha Truth featuring Shawty Lo & Yung Quis) Street King
2012
 "36 0's" - (Chopper City featuring Shawty Lo) Louisiana Purchase
 "Cry Baby" - (Genesis featuring Shawty Lo) Black Belt
 "Money Shower" - (Jurrarri featuring Ashle and Shawty Lo) Rubber Band Rrarri
 "Solo" - (Waka Flocka Flame featuring Shawty Lo) Salute Me or Shoot Me 4 (Banned from America)
 "MVP" - (Gucci Mane featuring Rocko & Shawty Lo) Gucci 3D
 "Last Call" - (Yung Joc featuring Shawty Lo and Yung Ralph) Bitch I'm Joc
 "Pile Up" - (Chubbie Baby featuring Big Zak, Shawty Lo & Bleu Davinci) 36 Oz, Part 2
2013
 "On Me" - (Strap Da Fool featuring Shawty Lo) All In
 "Tell Em' That" - (Gucci Mane featuring Shawty Lo & Peewee Longway) Trap House III
 "Solo" - (Dorrough featuring Waka Flocka Flame & Shawty Lo) Shut the City Down

References

Hip hop discographies
 
 
Discographies of American artists